Isla San Martín is an island in the Pacific Ocean west of the Baja California Peninsula. The island is uninhabited and is part of the Ensenada Municipality.

Biology
Isla San Martín has six species of reptiles: Anniella geronimensis (Baja California legless lizard), Diadophis punctatus (ring-necked snake), Elgaria multicarinata (southern alligator lizard), Hypsiglena ochrorhyncha (coast night snake), Pituophis catenifer (gopher snake), and Uta stansburiana (common side-blotched lizard).

Formerly, the San Martin Island woodrat  lived on the island, until it became extinct due to predation by feral cats.

References

http://herpatlas.sdnhm.org/places/overview/isla-san-mart%C3%ADn/42/1/

Islands of Ensenada Municipality
Islands of Baja California
Uninhabited islands of Mexico